The 2021 Arctic Rally Finland (also known as the Arctic Rally Finland Powered by CapitalBox 2021) was a motor racing event for rally cars that was held over three days between 26 and 28 February 2021. It marked the fifty-seventh running of the Arctic Rally, and the first time the event has been run as a round of the World Rally Championship. The event was the second round of the 2021 World Rally Championship, World Rally Championship-2 and World Rally Championship-3. The 2021 event was based in Rovaniemi in Lapland and was contested over ten special stages totalling  in competitive distance.

Kalle Rovanperä and Jonne Halttunen were the defending rally winners, having won the 2020 rally when it was held as part of the Finnish Rally Championship.

Ott Tänak and Martin Järveoja won the event. Esapekka Lappi and Janne Ferm won the World Rally Championship-2 category, while Teemu Asunmaa and Marko Salminen were the winners in the World Rally Championship-3.

Background

Addition on the calendar
The Arctic Rally was not included on the first calendar published by the World Motorsport Council.  The event was a late addition when Rally Sweden was cancelled in response to the COVID-19 pandemic. The Arctic Rally was chosen over six other reserve events because Rally Sweden was the only snow-based event on the calendar, and none of the reserve events were planned to run on snow. Competitors are required to wear warmer overalls than usual for safety reasons.

The Arctic Rally was run twice in 2021. The first running in January was held as a round of the Finnish national rally Championship, while the second running in February was a World Championship round. The national-level event was won by Juho Hänninen, driving a Toyota Yaris WRC. The two events have the same organisers and similar routes.

Championship standings prior to the event
Reigning World Champions Sébastien Ogier and Julien Ingrassia entered the round with a nine-point lead over Elfyn Evans and Scott Martin. Thierry Neuville and Martijn Wydaeghe were third, a further four points behind. In the World Rally Championship for Manufacturers, Toyota Gazoo Racing WRT held a twenty-two-point lead over defending manufacturers' champions Hyundai Shell Mobis WRT, followed by M-Sport Ford WRT.

In the World Rally Championship-2 standings, Andreas Mikkelsen and Ola Fløene held an eight-point lead ahead of Adrien Fourmaux and Renaud Jamoul in the drivers' and co-drivers' standings respectively, with Eric Camilli and François-Xavier Buresi in third. In the teams' championship, Toksport WRT led Movisport by ten points.

In the World Rally Championship-3 standings, Yohan Rossel and Benoît Fulcrand led the drivers' and co-drivers' standings by six points respectively. Yoann Bonato and Benjamin Boulloud were second, with Nicolas Ciamin and Yannick Roche in third in both standings, trailing by two points.

Entry list
The following crews were entered into the rally. The event was open to crews competing in the World Rally Championship, its support categories, the World Rally Championship-2 and World Rally Championship-3, and privateer entries that were not registered to score points in any championship. Thirteen entries for the World Rally Championship were received, as were ten in the World Rally Championship-2 and twenty-three in the World Rally Championship-3.

In detail
Oliver Solberg is set to make his Rally1 début in a Hyundai i20 Coupe WRC prepared and entered by Hyundai's satellite team Hyundai 2C Competition at the rally. His co-driver for this rally is Sebastian Marshall as his regular co-driver Aaron Johnston has to miss the rally after he was found positive with COVID-19. FIA World Rallycross Championship driver Mattias Ekström will make a one-off appearance in the rally.

Route
The rally will be contested over ten special stages totalling  in competitive distance. The route of the rally is different to that of the first running of the event in January 2021. All of the stages will be run in reverse, with the exception of the Aittajärvi Power Stage. The Mustalampi stage returned to the itinerary from previous runnings of the Arctic Rally, with some sections being brand-new.

Itinerary
All dates and times are EET (UTC+2).

Report

World Rally Cars
Ott Tänak and Martin Järveoja won the event for Hyundai. Kalle Rovanperä and Jonne Halttunen finished second for Toyota and took the lead in the championship. Ogier crashed on Saturday but was allowed to restart the next day. Solberg lost fifteen seconds to an off on the power stage, on which Rovanperä set the fastest time to claim the maximum bonus points, 0.2 seconds faster than Craig Breen and Paul Nagle.

Classification

Special stages

Championship standings

World Rally Championship-2

Classification

Special stages

Championship standings

World Rally Championship-3

Classification

Special stages

Championship standings

Notes

References

External links

  
 2021 Arctic Rally Finland at eWRC-results.com
 The official website of the World Rally Championship

2021 in Finnish sport
2021 World Rally Championship season
February 2021 sports events in Europe
Arctic challenges